The Ever Power IPP Co., Ltd. is an independent power producer company in Taiwan. It operates as the subsidiary of Singapore Power International Pte. Ltd.

History
The company was founded on 30 January 1996.

Power plants
 Changsheng Power Plant in Luzhu District, Taoyuan City.

See also

 Electricity sector in Taiwan
 List of power stations in Taiwan

References 

Taiwanese companies established in 1996
Electric power companies of Taiwan
Energy companies established in 1996